Kvemo Azhara is a village in the upper part of the Kodori Valley, situated in Gulripshi District, Abkhazia, a breakaway republic from Georgia.

History
Prior to August 2008, Kvemo Azhara was part of 'Upper Abkhazia', the only part of Abkhazia controlled by the Georgian government. The village was home to the headquarters of Government of the Autonomous Republic of Abkhazia, recognised by Georgia as the only legitimate government of Abkhazia. The village and the surrounding area were undergoing a major rehabilitation program. During the August 2008 war in South Ossetia, Abkhazian forces gained control of Kvemo Azhara and the rest of Upper Abkhazia.

Notes and References

See also
 2007 Georgia helicopter incident
 Gulripshi District

Upper Abkhazia
Populated places in Gulripshi District